Manisha Kalyan  (born 27 November 2001) is an Indian professional footballer who plays as a midfielder for Cypriot First Division club Apollon and the India women's national team. She won the 2020–21 AIFF Women's Emerging Footballer of the Year award.

Early life 

Manisha was born in Muggowal, located in the district of Horshiarpur, Punjab. She studied in Sant Attar Singh Khalsa Senior Secondary School and graduated from Mehr Chand Mahajan DAV College for Women. She started playing football at the age of 13. Brahmjit Singh was the coach who spotted Kalyan's talent as a PE teacher at Government Middle School in her village Muggowal.

Club career

Gokulam Kerala  
In 2018, Manisha signed with the newly formed Indian Women's League club Gokulam Kerala. She played a pivotal role in Gokulam's success in the 2019–20 IWL campaign. She scored 2 goals against the Kenkre FC which they won 1–10 and she scored a goal in their semi-finals against the Sethu FC. She scored 3 goals in the tournament and were chosen as the emerging player of the tournament.

In 2021, she became the first women player from India to score in a top-flight Asian competition, when she scored in the 2021 AFC Women's Club Championship match against FC Bunyodkor Women's Team of Uzbekistan on 14 November, which they won 3–1 at full-time.

Apollon Ladies 
On July 3, 2022, it was officially announced that Kalyan signed a contract with Limassol based Cypriot First Division club Apollon Ladies. She made her debut for the club on 18 August, coming on as a 60th minute substitute in a 3–0 win against Rīgas FS at the UEFA Women's Champions League qualifying round.

On 2 October 2022, she scored her first goal for the club against Aris Limassol in a Cypriot First Division match.

International career 
Manisha was selected for the India Under-17 National Squad to play the 2018 BRICS U-17 Football Cup which was held in South Africa. She scored a goal against China Under-17 which they ended up losing 2–1. Manisha was later then promoted to the India Under-19 National Team. She got the attention of the public when she delivered a memorable performance in India's inspiring win over Thailand in the AFC U-19 Women's Championship Qualifiers. She had scored a hat-trick in the same tournament against Pakistan which resulted in the victory of India on a big margin of 18–0. Manisha got her senior team call-up for the match against Hong Kong in January 2019 at the age of 17.

Though Kalyan debuted against Hong Kong in January 2019, she scored her maiden goal against UAE on 2 October 2021 as India won the match with a score of 4–1.

With India, Kalyan went to Brazil for appearing in the 2021 International Women's Football Tournament of Manaus. On 26 November 2021, she created history after scoring a goal against Brazil in their 6–1 defeat at the 2021 International Women's Football Tournament of Manaus.

International goals

India U-17, U-18 & U-19

Senior Appearance

Style of play 
Manisha is an attacking midfielder and is known for her both creativity and her physicality. She is a versatile player who can attack and operate in the wings and even performs as a N°9.

Personal life 
She is the younger daughter of Narinder Pal, a businessman and Rajkumari Pal, a homemaker.

In an interview with Goal, Manisha revealed that she is a supporter of Argentine player Lionel Messi.

Career statistics

Club

Honours
India
 SAFF Women's Championship: 2019
 South Asian Games Gold medal: 2019

Gokulam Kerala
Indian Women's League: 2019–20, 2021–22

Apollon
Cypriot First Division: 2022–23

Individual
 Indian Women's League Hero of the League: 2021–22
 Indian Women's League Emerging Player: 2019–20
 AIFF Women's Player of the Year: 2021–22
 AIFF Women's Emerging Footballer of the Year: 2020–21

See also 

List of Indian football players in foreign leagues
List of Indian Women's League hat-tricks

References

External links 
 Manisha Kalyan at All India Football Federation
 
Manisha Kalyan's interview with Goal (Archived)
 Manisha Kalyan at Flashscore
 
 Manisha Kalyan at FBREF
Manisha Kalyan at Playmaker Stats

Living people
Women from Punjab, India
Footballers from Hoshiarpur
Footballers from Punjab, India
Sportswomen from Punjab, India
Indian women's footballers
Sethu FC players
Gokulam Kerala FC Women players
Apollon Ladies F.C. players
2001 births
India women's international footballers
India women's youth international footballers
Women's association football forwards
South Asian Games gold medalists for India
South Asian Games medalists in football
Indian Women's League players
Indian expatriate women's footballers
Expatriate women's footballers in Cyprus